William Hay (1816 – 14 November 1908) was an Australian politician.

Early life

Hay was born in Banffshire, Scotland, educated at the University of Aberdeen and arrived in Sydney in 1838.

Parliamentary career
He was elected as the member for the Murray in the New South Wales Legislative Assembly in 1872 and held the seat until 1877.  He held it again from 1880 to 1882. Hay won the seat at the 1872 by-election caused by the resignation of Patrick Jennings.

He was re-elected at the 1874-75 election, but did not contest the 1877 election. Murray became a two-member electorate for the 1880 election and Hay was elected along with Alexander Wilson. Hay did not contest the 1882 election.

Death

References

 

1816 births
1908 deaths
Members of the New South Wales Legislative Assembly
19th-century Australian politicians